

From 1941 to 1950

From 1951 to 1960

From 1961 to 1970

From 1971 to 1980

From 1981 to 1990
1986 // Goaltender // Ron Cossette // Wpg South Blues

From 1991 to 2000

From 2001

External links 
Manitoba Junior Hockey League
Manitoba Hockey Hall of Fame
Hockey Hall of Fame
Winnipeg Free Press Archives
Brandon Sun Archives

All-Star Teams